Nicholas J. Wade (27 March 1942) is a British psychologist and academic. He is an emeritus professor in the psychology department of the University of Dundee in Scotland, and the author of books and technical articles. His work has focused on visual perception.

Books 

 Wade, N. J. (2017). Visual Allusions: Pictures of Perception. London: Routledge. Psychology Library Editions: Perception (Book 32).  (Hbk) 9781138205086 (eBook) 
 Wade, N. J. (2016).  Art and Illusionists. Heidelberg: Springer.   (Hbk) 9783319252292 (eBook) 
 Piccolino, M., and Wade, N. J. (2014). Galileo's Visions: piercing the spheres of the heavens by eye and mind. Oxford: Oxford University Press. (Hbk) 9780199554358 (Pbk). 
 Wade, N. J., and Swanston, M. T. (2013). Visual Perception: An Introduction. 3rd. Ed. Hove, UK: Psychology Press.  (Hbk) 9781848720425 (Pbk)   
 Meulders, M., Piccolino, M., and Wade, N. J. (Eds.) (2010). Giuseppe Moruzzi, Ritratti di uno scienziato, Portraits of a scientist. Pisa: Edizioni ETS. 
 Wade, N. J. (2007) Circles: Science, Sense and Symbol. Dundee: Dundee University Press. . Details
 Piccolino, M., and Wade, N. J. (2007) Insegne Ambiguë. Percorsi Obliqui tra Storia, Scienza e Arte, da Galileo a Magritte. Pisa: Edizioni ETS. .  Details
 Wade, N. J., and Tatler, B. W. (2005) The Moving Tablet of the Eye: The Origins of Modern Eye Movement Research. Oxford: Oxford University Press.  (Hbk.), 0198566174 (Pbk.) Details
 Wade, N. J. (2005) Perception and Illusion. Historical Perspectives. New York: Springer.  Details
 Wade, N. J. (2003) (Ed.) Müller’s Elements of Physiology. 4 vols. Bristol: Thoemmes. Details
 Wade, N. J. (2003) Destined for Distinguished Oblivion: The Scientific Vision of William Charles Wells (1757-1817). New York: Kluwer/Plenum.
 Wade, N. J. (2002) (Ed.) Thomas Young's Lectures on Natural Philosophy and the Mechanical Arts (1807). Bristol: Thoemmes.
 Wade, N.J., and Swanston, M. (2001) Visual Perception: An Introduction. 2nd edition. London: Psychology Press.
 Wade, N. J., and Brozek, J. (2001) Purkinje's Vision. The Dawning of Neuroscience. Mahwah, NJ: Lawrence Erlbaum Associates.
 Wade, N. J. (2000) (Ed.) The Emergence of Neuroscience in the Nineteenth Century. 8 vols. London: Routledge/Thoemmes Press.
 Wade, N. J. (2000) (Ed.) Helmholtz's Treatise on Physiological Optics. 3 vols. Bristol: Thoemmes Press.
 Wade, N. J. (1998) A Natural History of Vision. Cambridge, MA: MIT Press.
 Wade, N. (1995) Psychologists in Word and Image. Cambridge, MA: MIT Press. (Korean language edition translated by Sang-Hun Lee. Saegil Publishing Co. 1996.)
 Wade, N.J., and Swanston, M. (1991) Visual Perception: An Introduction. London: Routledge. (Israeli edition translated by Bat'sheva Mance. Ach, Tel Aviv. 1994.)
 Wade, N. (1990) Visual Allusions: Pictures of Perception. London: Lawrence Erlbaum. (Japanese language edition translated by Michiaki Kondo. Nakanishiya Shuppan, Tokyo. 1991.)
 Wade, N.J. (1983) (Ed.) Brewster and Wheatstone on Vision. London: Academic Press.
 Wade, N. (1982) The Art and Science of Visual Illusions. London: Routledge & Kegan Paul. (Japanese language edition translated by Michiaki Kondo. Seishinshobo, Tokyo. 1988.)

References 

Living people
Academics of the University of Dundee
British psychologists
1942 births